Pterostylis turfosa, commonly known as the bearded bird orchid, is a species of orchid which is endemic to the south-west of Western Australia. Flowering plants have a single translucent green flower with darker green veins, on a flowering stem with up to eighteen stem leaves. It is one of a number of bearded orchids, some of which have yet to be formally described, all of which have a distinctive feather-like labellum.

Description
Pterostylis turfosa is a terrestrial, perennial, deciduous, herb with an underground tuber. The flowers appear from September to October.

Taxonomy and naming
Pterostylis turfosa was first described in 1846 by Stephan Endlicher and the description was published in the second volume of Lehmann's book Plantae Preissianae. The specific epithet (turfosa) is a Latin word meaning "peaty".

Distribution and habitat
The bearded bird orchid grows in a wide variety of habitats, from shallow soil pockets on granite outcrops to forest but mainly close to the coast. It occurs between Bunbury and East Mount Barren.

References

turfosa
Endemic orchids of Australia
Orchids of Western Australia
Plants described in 1846
Endemic flora of Western Australia